This is a list of the 1967 PGA Tour Qualifying School graduates.

Tournament summary 
The tournament was played over 144 holes at the PGA National Golf Club in Palm Beach Gardens, Florida in mid-October. The field of 111 was considered to have a number of "star" amateur golfers. These included Deane Beman, Bob Murphy, Ron Cerrudo, Marty Fleckman, and Bunky Henry. In addition, the field included Lee Elder, "whom many are predicting will be the first top-ranking Negro player." A number of international golfers played. These included the top three golfers from Britain: Tony Jacklin, Peter Townsend, and Clive Clark. Burmese golfer Mya Aye tried out for the tour at the tournament. He was successful becoming one of the first Asians to receive a PGA Tour card. South Africa's Bobby Cole was the medallist, tying the record for lowest total. Thirty players earned their tour card in total.

List of graduates 

Sources:

References

PGA Tour Qualifying School
Golf in Florida
PGA Tour Qualifying School Graduates
PGA Tour Qualifying School Graduates